The 2019 Renault UK Clio Cup was a multi-event, one make motor racing championship held across England. The championship features a mix of professional motor racing teams and privately funded drivers competing in the Clio Renaultsport 200 Turbo EDC that conform to the technical regulations for the championship. Organised by the British Automobile Racing Club, it forms part of the extensive program of support categories built up around the British Touring Car Championship. It was the 24th Renault Clio Cup United Kingdom season and the 44th of UK motorsport undertaken by Renault and Renault Sport.

Teams and drivers

The following teams and drivers were signed to run the 2019 season. All teams and drivers were British-registered.

Race Calendar

Championship standings

Notes
One point is awarded to a competitor who leads a Renault UK Clio Cup race. This can only be awarded once to a driver that crosses the start/finish line in the lead.
Two points are awarded to the Driver(s) setting the fastest lap in each round.
Drivers shall count their results from the total number of races run less one race.
Each driver’s single dropped score cannot  be  taken  from  the  final  two  rounds of  the championship.
Competitors  who  are  excluded  from any race must count that excluded race within their total score.

Drivers' championship

Graduate Cup

References

External links

 

Renault Clio Cup UK seasons
Renault UK Clio Cup